Bhupendra Thapa Magar is a Nepali  professional boxer. He won the Gold Medal at 2019 South Asian Games held in Nepal. He represents Nepal Police Club.

References

Living people
Year of birth missing (living people)